Jalan Bangsar is a major road in Kuala Lumpur, Malaysia.

Construction of the Jalan Travers-Bangsar flyover junctions
The Jalan Travers-Bangsar junctions have been upgraded into flyover junctions. Construction began in early 2010 and was completed in mid-2010. Both projects were led by Kuala Lumpur City Hall (Dewan Bandaraya Kuala Lumpur) (DBKL) and Malaysian Resources Corporation Berhad (MRCB). On 8 August 2010, the flyover of the Jalan Travers-Bangsar junctions opened to traffic.

List of interchange/junctions

Highways in Malaysia
Expressways and highways in the Klang Valley
Roads in Kuala Lumpur